Robert William Straub (May 6, 1920 – November 27, 2002) was an American politician and businessman from the state of Oregon. A native of San Francisco, California, he settled in Eugene, Oregon, where he entered politics. A Democratic politician, he served in the Oregon State Senate, as the Oregon State Treasurer, and one term as the 31st Governor of Oregon from 1975 to 1979. Like his perennial opponent for governor, Tom McCall, he was a noted environmentalist.

Early life
Robert William Straub was born on May 6, 1920, in San Francisco. His parents were Thomas J. and Mary Tulley Straub who were staunch Republicans. During World War II, he served in the Army's Quartermaster Corps. Straub earned a bachelor of arts degree from Dartmouth College in 1943, and then a masters of business administration from the school in 1947.

While a student at Dartmouth, he married Pat Straub (née Stroud) in 1943, and they had three sons and three daughters. In 1946, the family moved to Springfield, Oregon, when  Straub accepted a job at the new Weyerhaeuser facility there. At Weyerhauser he worked with former classmate and later Speaker of the Oregon House of Representatives Richard Eymann. Straub also established a construction firm. He became independently wealthy by investing in the stock market, in real estate development, and trading in timber.

Political career
Straub worked at his construction firm until beginning his political career when he was elected to the Lane County Board of Commissioners in 1954. Straub served on the commission from 1955 to 1959. He represented Lane County in the Oregon State Senate from 1959 to 1963. During his time in the senate, Straub established his reputation as an advocate for natural resource management and conservation. He was one of the state's first leaders to voice concern about air and water pollution.

In 1964, Straub was elected to a four-year term as the Oregon State Treasurer. Two years later he ran unsuccessfully for the Governor's Office, losing to Tom McCall. As State Treasurer, Straub worked to create the Local Government Investment Pool and the Oregon Public Employees Retirement System (PERS). He also opposed construction on U.S. Highway 101 planned for an area south of Tillamook where the highway was planned to go across the Nestucca River, up the sandspit past Cape Kiwanda along the ocean front. He helped lead those opposed to the plan and was able to get the highway built closer to its previous location inland. Straub served two terms in the office, from 1965 to 1973, and lost a second bid against McCall in 1970.

Governor of Oregon
McCall was prohibited by the state constitution from seeking a third consecutive term in the 1974 election. Straub was finally able to win the state's top job that year, defeating then-State Senator Victor G. Atiyeh, winning the largest margin in an Oregon gubernatorial race since 1950. Straub's tenure as governor saw the state's energy and land use laws strengthened. He also worked to increase property tax relief and to provide utility rate relief for senior citizens. He appointed more women, minorities and disabled people to head state agencies than any previous Oregon governor. Other accomplishments included reducing the unemployment rate to 5% from 12% and working to end plans for the proposed Mount Hood Freeway. Straub was defeated in his re-election bid in 1978 in a rematch with Atiyeh.

Later years
Following his reelection defeat, Straub owned and operated farms in Salem, Springfield, Curtin,  and Willamina. In addition, he also operated a ranch in Wheeler County. Straub considered running against Bob Packwood in 1986 for Packwood's U.S. Senate seat, but decided not to challenge the Republican. In 1987, Nestucca Spit State Park near Pacific City was renamed Bob Straub State Park in his honor, and a conference room at Lane County's government offices was named in his honor in 2001. In 1999, he announced that he was suffering from Alzheimer's disease. He died on November 27, 2002 of complications from the disease in the Gateway Living Center nursing home in Springfield, Oregon at the age of 82.

References

External links
 Genealogy of Robert William Straub
 Robert Straub - (1920-2002)
 

1920 births
2002 deaths
Democratic Party governors of Oregon
State treasurers of Oregon
Democratic Party Oregon state senators
United States Army personnel of World War II
People from Springfield, Oregon
Politicians from Eugene, Oregon
Politicians from San Francisco
Dartmouth College alumni
Neurological disease deaths in Oregon
Deaths from Alzheimer's disease
20th-century American politicians
American environmentalists
Businesspeople from Eugene, Oregon
Businesspeople from San Francisco
20th-century American businesspeople